Beautiful is the third studio album by American singer Vivian Green. It was released by E1 Music on April 6, 2010 in the United States. Her first album after her departure from Columbia Records, on which she released her first two albums, Green reteamed with longtime friend and collaborator Anthony Bell to work on Beautiful, with addition production provided by Jason Farmer. Title track "Beautiful" served the album's leading single and was released February 23, 2010. The song entitled "Jordan's Song" is also a dedication to her son.

Critical reception

Allmusic editor Andy Kellman found that "though it arrives almost five years after her previous album and was made on a significantly lower budget, it won’t throw anyone for a loop, as it sounds just like a Vivian Green album, one that deals with a fair amount of heartache as well as the rush that comes with finding new love. It’s less about big hooks than nuanced arrangements, even on the heavily synthesized/programmed songs, and Green’s lyrics are as easily relatable as ever."

Chart performance
The album debuted at number 101 on the Billboard 200, number 26 on the Top R&B/Hip-Hop Albums chart, and number 13 on the Top Independent Albums chart. , the album has sold more than 22,000 copies.

Track listing

Charts

References

External links
 
 

2010 albums
E1 Music albums
Vivian Green albums